Justus Peterson (1860–1889) was a Swedish artist.

He was born on 8 August 1860 in Malmbäck. He worked mostly with palette and made reproductions in this manner for several Swedish artists such as Carl Larsson, Höckert and Oscar Björck.

He died on 10 October 1889 in Stockholm.

Gallery

References

1860 births
1889 deaths
Swedish artists
19th-century Swedish people